Constantine III was King of the Abkhazia from  894 to 923 AD. He was the son and successor of Bagrat I of the Anchabadze dynasty.

Life 

Constantine's reign is marked as a constant fighting for the hegemony within the Georgian territories. The increasingly expansionist tendencies of the kingdom led to the enlargement of its realm to the east. In 904 he had finally annexed a significant portion of Kartli, bringing his borders close to the Arab-controlled Tiflis (modern-day Tbilisi). 

Soon he had to face the alliance of the King Smbat I of Armenia and Adarnase IV of Iberia. The two men collaborated in defeating Constantine III, their common relative, who competed with Adarnase for hegemony in Inner Iberia and with Smbat in Gugark. Adarnase captured Constantine and turned him over to Smbat. Constantine was imprisoned in Ani. Smbat freed his captive in order to make an alliance against the resurgent Muslims. This alliance was facilitated by Constantine's marriage to the Smbat's daughter. This move, however, turned Adarnase against Smbat. In 912, when Emir Yusuf ibn Abi'l-Saj invaded Armenia, Smbat attempted to take refuge in Abkhazia, but Adarnase did not let him cross his territories and was eventually captured and hanged at Dvin (914). Subsequently, Yusuf ibn Abi'l-Saj took the opportunity to devastate the Tao-Klarjeti. This campaign was one of the last major attempts on the part of the Abbasid Caliphate to retain its crumbling hold of the Georgian lands, which, at that time, were a patchwork of rival, native states and Muslim holdings. As a result of the campaign, Tao-Klarjeti was weakened. Constantine III used Adarnase's weakness and restored his authority over Kartli. Adarnase was relegated to his portion of the Bagratid hereditary lands in Tao and was forced to recognize himself as a vassal of Constantine III. This was the beginning of almost sixty years of Abkhazian dominance over Tao-Klarjeti. Next year, Constantine forged an alliance with Kvirike I of Kakheti. The allies invaded Hereti (principality in the Georgian-Albanian marchlands) and divided its major strongholds.

Constantine III also tried to extend his influence over Alania by supporting their Christianization.

Family 
Constantine III married a daughter of Adarnase IV of Iberia:

Issue 
 Anonymous daughter, married to Ashot of Klarjeti
 George II, king of the Abkhazia from 916 until 960.
 Bagrat II, co-king of Abkhazia.

Genealogy

Sources. 
 Marie-Félicité Brosset, Histoire de la Géorgie..

References 

Constantine 03
9th-century Kings of Abkhazia